Doug Lind is an American mathematician specializing in ergodic theory and dynamical systems. He is a professor emeritus at the University of Washington. Lind was named as one of the inaugural fellows of the American Mathematical Society in 2013. He is a board member of Spectra, an association for LGBT mathematicians.

Education

Lind received his PhD from Stanford University in 1973. His advisor was Donald Samuel Ornstein and the title of his dissertation was Locally Compact Measure Preserving Flows.

See also 
 Daniel Rudolph - contemporary of Doug Lind

References

20th-century American mathematicians
21st-century American mathematicians
Fellows of the American Mathematical Society
Living people
Year of birth missing (living people)
LGBT mathematicians
University of Washington faculty
LGBT academics
21st-century LGBT people